Sulla mia pelle is the first album by Italian singer Noemi, released on October 2, 2009. The album was certified double platinum by the Federation of the Italian Music Industry.

Track listing Sulla mia pelle

Bonus track
Only for those who download the album from iTunes

Sulla mia pelle tour (prima parte)

Sulla mia pelle tour (prima parte) started on October 23, 2009 in Taneto di Gattatico and finished on January 16, 2010 in Sedico. The tour finished in this date because on February Noemi would participate in the sixtieth edition of the Sanremo Music Festival with the song "Per tutta la vita".
Tour was formed by 22 shows.

Band
Emanuele (Lele) Fontana (keyboard and hammond)
Donald Renda (drum and cajón)
 Davide Ferrario (guitar)
 Ronny Aglietti (bass)

Tour

Sulla mia pelle (Deluxe Edition)

On February 19, 2010, Sulla mia pelle (Deluxe Edition) was re-released.

Track listing Sulla mia pelle (Deluxe Edition)

Bonus track
Only for those who download the album from iTunes

Sulla mia pelle tour (seconda parte)

Sulla mia pelle tour (seconda parte) started on April 15, 2010 to Campi Bisenzio and finished on October 15, 2010 in Orani. Tour was formed by 53 shows.

Band
Emanuele (Lele) Fontana (keyboard and hammond)
Claudio Storniolo (piano)
Gabriele Greco (bass and double bass)
Bernardo Baglioni (guitar)
Donald Renda (drum and cajón)

Stage tour

Charts

Album

Singles

References

2009 albums
2010 albums
Noemi (singer) albums
Sony Music Italy albums